Licence laundering or license laundering occurs when a creative work under copyright is copied by another party, who then replaces the original licence with a different one. This party then illegitimately distributes the work with the new licence.

Content laundering
The online repository Wikimedia Commons hosts media and other files that are freely licensed, such as those that are in the public domain, which may be redistributed without consent or royalty payment to the author. Files uploaded to the repository that have restrictive licensing terms, such as those prohibiting the creation of derivative works or making commercial use of the file, are deleted.

The image hosting and video hosting website Flickr is a popular source of files for Wikimedia Commons. Its users upload content they create to Flickr's servers, assigning a licence for each work or accepting a default copyright licence. It was found that some Flickr users upload content that is not their own creation, and for which they have no authority or licence grant to do so. Some of these works are erroneously assigned a free licence, apparently permitting their unrestricted distribution, including uploading the content to Wikimedia Commons. The practice has come to be known as "Flickr washing" on Wikimedia Commons, as it is the most common site from which licence laundered files are uploaded.

Licence laundering of media and related files is common on image hosting providers such as Flickr or Picasa, and video hosting providers such as YouTube.

Source code laundering
In software development, a programmer engages in licence laundering when using source code written by one or more other programmers but removing the licence from the source files or altering the file's header to exclude its revision history or other details. This source code is then modified or integrated into other software, possibly violating the original licence terms.

Another example is using code released under one licence, and redistributing it under a different licence. After SCO Group asserted it owned the intellectual property rights to Unix, a series of SCO/Linux controversies resulted, with SCO Groups chief executive officer Darl McBride stating that "The world is not about stealing people's code, laundering it and saying everything's OK." In SCO Group, Inc. v. Novell, Inc., Novell was found to be the owner of Unix copyrights.

Code for open-source software may be released with a pre-approved non-reciprocal licence permitting its use in other projects, which facilitates license laundering. To avoid such laundering, developers and project managers should determine the source of the code, and mitigate potential problems with a quality assurance inspection.

Identification
Licence laundering may be identified by detecting inconsistencies in the works. Most content creators use a set of common elements that are consistent throughout their portfolio, for example a style or handwriting. Users engaged in licence laundering typically upload files with a diversity of styles, since the styles reflect those of the author, not the licence laundering uploader.

Image licence laundering may be detected by using reverse image search engines, such as TinEye or Google Images' "Search by Image" feature. These services compare the characteristics of a reference work to a database containing the characteristics for numerous works analyzed by the service provider by spidering the World Wide Web. The results of a reverse image search may indicate the original source of the content.

Another technique involves inspecting the Exif data associated with files. If the data is generally consistent in a set of files, the files were likely generated by the same individual, whereas if the data differ significantly, it may be indicative of a copyright infringement. An example is a set of photographs generated by different camera models.

See also
 :c:Commons:License laundering

References

Further reading
 

Licenses
Copyright infringement